Ilya Nikolayevich Agapov (born 21 January 2001) is a Russian football player who plays for CSKA Moscow.

Club career
He made his debut in the Russian Football National League for FC Neftekhimik Nizhnekamsk on 9 March 2020 in a game against FC Rotor Volgograd. He started the game and played the full match.

On 2 June 2021, he signed a contract with FC Spartak Moscow until 31 May 2022 and was assigned to FC Spartak-2 Moscow.

On 13 July 2022, Agapov signed with FC Pari Nizhny Novgorod. He made his Russian Premier League debut for Pari NN on 7 August 2022 against PFC Sochi.

On 6 January 2023, Agapov signed a contract with CSKA Moscow until 2027.

International career
Agapov was called up to the Russia national football team for the first time in November 2022 for friendly games against Tajikistan and Uzbekistan.

Career statistics

References

External links
 Profile by Russian Football National League
 
 
 

2001 births
Footballers from Kazan
Living people
Russian footballers
Russia youth international footballers
Russia under-21 international footballers
Association football defenders
FC Rubin Kazan players
FC Neftekhimik Nizhnekamsk players
FC Spartak-2 Moscow players
FC Nizhny Novgorod (2015) players
PFC CSKA Moscow players
Russian First League players
Russian Premier League players